Connelly (from Ó Conghalaigh) may refer to:

People
 Connelly (surname)

Other
4816 Connelly, A Main-belt asteroid
Connelly Foundation, a Philadelphia philanthropic organization
Connelly Range, a mountain range in British Columbia, Canada
Connelly School of the Holy Child, Potomac, Maryland
Connelly sphere, a flexible polyhedron in geometry
Connellys Springs, North Carolina, a town in Burke County
Connelly Township, Minnesota, a township in Wilkin County
Connelly-Yerwood House, historic house in Austin, Texas
Cornelia Connelly High School, Anaheim, California
Bear Lake (Fort Connelly), former name of Bear Lake, British Columbia, Canada
Smith-Connelly Act, an American anti-strike act (1943)

See also
Conley (disambiguation)
Connolly (disambiguation)